Robert Hawker (1753–1827) was an Anglican priest in Devon, vicar of Charles Church, Plymouth. Called "Star of the West" for his popular preaching, he was known as an evangelical and author. The Cornish poet Robert Stephen Hawker was his grandson.

Early life
Hawker was born in Exeter in 1753 to Jacob Hawker, a surgeon in Exeter. He was married aged 19 to Anna Rains, and they had eight children altogether.

Hawker studied medicine in Plymouth under Samuel White of Bretonside, and joined the Royal Marines as assistant surgeon. In 1778 he entered Magdalen College, Oxford.

References

Further reading
Comb, George (1827) A Tribute of Respect to Departed Greatness: being the substance of a sermon, delivered on occasion of the decease of the Rev. Robert Hawker, D.D. Vicar of Charles, Plymouth, at Soho Chapel, Oxford Street, London, Lord's day evening, 15 April 1827. London: Ebenezer Palmer
 Mutter, George (1827) Zion's Faithful Priest: a sermon, occasioned by the death of the late Rev. Robert Hawker, D.D. Vicar of Charles, Plymouth: delivered on Sunday evening, 22 April 1827, at the Broadway Church, St. Margaret's, Westminster / by the Rev. George Mutter, A.M. minister of Broadway Church. London:  Ebenezer Palmer
Palmer, Ebenezer (1826) Prospectus of a handsome, uniform edition of the works of the Rev. Robert Hawker ... London: printed for E. Palmer 
Williams, John, minister of Stroud (1831) Memoirs of the Life and Writings of the Rev. Robert Hawker, D.D., late Vicar of Charles, Plymouth. London: E. Justins & Son, printers

External links

1753 births
1827 deaths
18th-century English Anglican priests
19th-century English Anglican priests
Clergy from Plymouth, Devon
Alumni of Magdalen College, Oxford
18th-century Royal Marines personnel
Medical doctors from Plymouth, Devon